Don Esteban, delivered in 1936, was the first and smaller of two Krupp built motor ships of the De La Rama Steamship Company, Iloilo, Philippines in inter-island service. The ship was under a bareboat charter by the United States Army as a transport on 30 October 1941 for use in pre positioning U.S. Army Air Corps (USAAC) fuel and munitions in the southern Philippines, Netherlands East Indies, Singapore and Australia. After the Japanese invasion of the Philippines she evacuated personnel from the Army headquarters, including General MacArthur, from Manila to Corregidor on Christmas Eve, 1941. The ship was lost off Mindoro on 2 March 1942 while continuing its supply missions.

Construction and civilian service
Don Esteban was constructed 1936 at Friedrich Krupp Germaniawerft A. G., Kiel, Germany for the inter-island passenger service of the De La Rama Steamship Company in Philippine waters. She was a diesel motor ship with two eight cylinder diesel engines driving two screws for a speed of sixteen knots. Along with the newer and larger Don Isidro the ship was noted as being among the more luxurious serving inter-island passengers.

U.S. Army transport
On 25 October 1941, with delivery for service 30 October 1941, the ship was bareboat chartered by the U.S. Army for its local Philippine fleet in support of a plan to establish pre-deployed fuel and munitions for use of a force of B-17 bombers being sent to reinforce the Philippines in the event of war with Japan. Dumps were planned for two mission's worth of fuel and bombs at Singapore and Darwin, Australia and one mission's supply at Rabaul and Port Moresby, both Australian controlled territories, with a depot at Rockhampton, Australia. The ship, with a capacity less than anticipated, only made initial deliveries to Rabaul and Port Moresby. The ship was returning to Manila, after orders to break from the mission due to the worsening situation in the Pacific, when news of the Pearl Harbor attack arrived. If already north of the Equator the ship was directed to continue to Manila, if still south of that line the ship was directed to return to Darwin. The ship was north and returned to Manila 9 December.

By 11 December the Japanese invasion was developing with commercial ships evacuating Manila Bay. By 14 December most of the U.S. Asiatic Fleet had withdrawn and all heavy bombers of the USAAC had withdrawn to Mindanao and on the 17th to Darwin. On 13 December Don Esteban departed Manila after loading bombs from USS Canopus destined for the Del Monte airfield on Mindanao. The ship returned to Manila, already under air attack, on 21 December after a stop at Iloilo to deliver small arms and ammunition. On the 22nd the ship had to evade air attack by getting under way into open waters. After successful evasion the ship was assigned to begin transporting supplies to Corregidor.

By 23 December MacArthur had decided to evacuate Manila and on Christmas Eve he, his family and his headquarters evacuated the city aboard Don Esteban in early evening with the flames of over a million gallons of Navy fuel oil lighting the sky. The ship landed the headquarters on Corregidor at 9:30 that night. During the further evacuation of Manila the ship transported medical personnel and those patients not able to board the improvised hospital ship Mactan to field hospitals in Bataan. Don Esteban continued evacuating personnel and supplies from the now open city of Manila to Bataan and Corregidor with a final departure assisting in removing Philippine government officials and the country's reserve gold and currency. On 19 February 1942 the ship departed with a party composed of Philippine officials, including vice president, Sergio Osmeña, to safety. After making contact with a submarine the ship went to Iloilo where the President briefly boarded until daylight when the ship departed for  Cebu City to load supplies for Corrigedor. Shortly after departure the ship was attacked by Japanese aircraft and the ship was ordered abandoned by  Captain Afable as the damage was severe and a cargo of gasoline was leaking. Survivors saw the ship erupt in flames after bombers returned along with Japanese surface vessels. The ship is shown in official records as being lost on 2 March 1942.

Don Esteban, along with some 25 other vessels chartered by Army to form a local Philippine support fleet supporting defense efforts shortly before the war's outbreak and to support forces on Bataan and later Corregidor, did not survive to escape to Australia.

Notes

References

References cited

)

External links
 Edward W. Weiss at Brooke County Public Library Foundation-ADBC Museum, Wellsburg WV 26070
 SS Don Esteban - De La Rama Lines Philippines

1936 ships
Ships built in Kiel
Passenger ships of the Philippines
Merchant ships of the Philippines
South West Pacific theatre of World War II
Military history of the Philippines during World War II
Maritime incidents in March 1942
Transport ships of the United States Army